Screen time is the amount of time electronic devices are used.

Screen time, Screentime or Screen Time may also refer to:

Screen Time - an iOS feature which tracks how long iOS devices are used.
Screentime - an Australian-based television production company
Screen Time (TV series) - am Australian TV series 
screen time - an instrumental album by Thurston Moore